Persatuan Sepakbola Indonesia Batanghari (simply known as Persibri Batanghari) is an Indonesian football club based in Batang Hari Regency, Jambi. They currently compete in the Liga 3.

Honours
 Liga 3 Jambi
 Champion: 2019

References

External links
 Persibri Batanghari Instagram

Football clubs in Indonesia
Football clubs in Jambi
Association football clubs established in 1960
1960 establishments in Indonesia